WXKX is a Sports-Talk formatted broadcast radio station licensed to Clarksburg, West Virginia, serving Clarksburg and Harrison County, West Virginia.  WXKX is owned and operated by Burbach Broadcasting Co.

External links

XKX